Voodoo is the eighth studio album by Danish heavy metal band King Diamond, released in 1998. It is the first album to feature drummer John Luke Hébert and the last to feature guitarist Herb Simonsen and bassist Chris Estes. The album cover was drawn by Kristian Wåhlin.

Voodoo was remastered by Andy LaRocque and re-released in 2009.

Plot
Voodoo takes place in the year 1932 and deals with the affairs of the Lafayettes, a family consisting of Sarah (who is pregnant), David, and Grandpa. They move to an old colonial house on the Mississippi River, just north of Baton Rouge, which also happens to have been built next to a voodoo graveyard.

Unknown to the Lafayettes, the colonial house's servant, Salem, is involved in voodoo. Salem partakes in voodoo rituals at the graveyard, along with Doctor le Croix, a voodoo sorcerer, Madame Sarita, and Lula Chevalier, a girl who is never seen.

The Lafayettes hear the voodoo drums from the ceremonies in the graveyard. They call a secret meeting with Salem to discuss what should be done. The Lafayettes decide to destroy the voodoo burial ground. Salem does not want this to happen, so he sneaks out at midnight to talk to Doctor le Croix. Le Croix gives Salem money to buy some goofer dust, and tells him that the Lafayettes must all die.

Salem puts a snake in David's room, mixes haunted graveyard dirt in Grandpa's food, and, after talking to the dead Baron Samedi, pours goofer dust on Sarah while she sleeps. David and Grandpa become very ill, and Sarah becomes possessed with a voodoo spirit.

Grandpa manages to call Father Malone, an exorcist. Father Malone travels to the colonial house to rid Sarah of her possessor. He fails, and is rendered unconscious from exhaustion. While he is unconscious, Lula brings the heavy, nail-riddled ceremonial cross of Baron Samedi to the possessed Sarah. Sarah attacks Malone with the cross, almost killing him. Grandpa comes in and tells Sarah to stop, and she does, which saves Father Malone's life. Grandpa calls the police and ambulance, which arrive two hours later.

The story concludes with Salem speaking about the aftermath of the situation, which also reveals that he escaped the events of the mansion. He explains that the Lafayettes abandoned the old colonial house after leaving the hospital.  Sarah's child was born and it was speaking "in the strangest tongue...backwards. Some expert had uttered the word...'Voodoo'..."

Release
Voodoo is one of the best-selling King Diamond's albums. It peaked at #27 in the Finnish Charts, remaining four weeks in the Top 40, and it peaked at #55 in the Swedish Charts, but remaining for just one week.

Track listing

Credits
King Diamond - vocals, keyboards, harpsichord, organ
Andy LaRocque - electric and acoustic guitars, keyboards
Herb Simonsen - electric guitars
Chris Estes - bass, acoustic guitars, keyboards
John Luke Hébert - drums, percussion
Dimebag Darrell - guitar solo on "Voodoo"
The Voodoo Story

References

1998 albums
King Diamond albums
Concept albums
Albums with cover art by Kristian Wåhlin
Rock operas
Massacre Records albums